This is a list of Members of Parliament elected in the 1945 Northern Ireland general election.

All members of the Northern Ireland House of Commons elected at the 1945 Northern Ireland general election are listed.

Members

Changes
1945: Jack Beattie joined the Federation of Labour (Ireland).
15 October 1945: William McCleery elected for the Unionists in North Antrim, following the death of Robert John Lynn.
22 August 1946: Francis Hanna elected for the Northern Ireland Labour Party in Belfast Central, following the resignation of Thomas Joseph Campbell.
7 November 1946: Terence O'Neill elected for the Unionists in Bannside, following the death of Malcolm Patrick.
27 June 1947: James Godfrey MacManaway elected for the Unionists in Londonderry City, following the resignation of William Lowry.
20 April 1948: Samuel Irwin elected for the Unionists in Queen's University Belfast, following the death of Frederick McSorley.
16 August 1948: Edward McCullagh elected for the Nationalist Party in Mid Tyrone, following the death of Michael McGurk.
1949: Jack Beattie disbanded the Federation of Labour (Ireland) and joined the Irish Labour Party.

References
Biographies of Members of the Northern Ireland House of Commons

1945